The 2018–19 Cypriot First Division was the 80th season of the Cypriot top-level football league.

Teams

Promotion and relegation (pre-season)
Aris Limassol and Ethnikos Achna were relegated at the end of the first-phase of the 2017–18 season after finishing in the bottom two places of the table. They were joined by Olympiakos Nicosia, who finished at the bottom of the second-phase relegation group.

The relegated teams were replaced by 2017–18 Second Division champions Enosis Neon Paralimni.

Stadiums and locations

Note: Table lists clubs in alphabetical order.

Personnel and kits 
Note: Flags indicate national team as has been defined under FIFA eligibility rules. Players and Managers may hold more than one non-FIFA nationality.

Regular season

League table

Results

Positions by Round
The table lists the positions of teams after each week of matches. In order to preserve chronological progress, any postponed matches are not included in the round at which they were originally scheduled, but added to the full round they were played immediately afterwards. For example, if a match is scheduled for matchday 13, but then postponed and played between days 16 and 17, it will be added to the standings for day 16.

Championship round

Championship round table

Results

Positions by Round
The table lists the positions of teams after each week of matches.

Relegation round

Relegation round table

Results

Positions by Round
The table lists the positions of teams after each week of matches.

Season statistics

Top scorers

Hat-tricks

 4 Player scored 4 goals.

References

External links

Cypriot First Division seasons
Cyprus
2018–19 in Cypriot football